State Route 120 (SR-120) is a state highway in the US state of Utah forming a business loop around I-70 serving the town of Richfield. The route forms the main street for Richfield and spans . The highway was established 1969, coinciding with the construction of I-70 through Sevier County.

Route description
The highway begins at a diamond interchange on I-70/US-89 at exit 37. From there, the route heads east on 1200 South, a four-lane undivided highway, in the southwestern portion of Richfield. The road continues east for ten blocks before turning northeast on Main Street, a four-lane road, and beginning an overlap with SR-118 (the former routing of US 89). Past 900 South, the road straightens out to the north and reaches central Richfield. At 300 North, SR-118 branches off to the east and SR-120 continues north on Main Street. The road passes a cemetery and a hospital before turning northeast. The route and Main Street terminate at another diamond interchange with I-70, this time at exit 40.

All of SR-120/I-70 Business is included in the National Highway System.

History
State Route 120 was established in 1969 as a road looping around I-70 in Richfield. The route was initially composed of three portions: a proposed road from the under-construction interchange at I-70 in southeast Richfield to Main Street, the existent portion of Main Street (then a part of US 89) north to 300 North, and another proposed road connecting this point to the north Richfield interchange. The proposed roads were completed in 1990, with the overlapping portion of US 89 along Main Street rerouted onto I-70 in 1992. No realignments have affected the route since then.

Major intersections

References

120
 120
Streets in Utah